Jabrian is a village in the Khyber Pakhtunkhwa province of Pakistan. It is located at 34°32'20N 73°2'5E with an altitude of 1724 metres (5659 feet). Neighbouring settlements include Patian, Bakiran, and Fag Banda.

References

Villages in Khyber Pakhtunkhwa